Podocotyloides is a genus of trematodes in the family Opecoelidae.

Species
Podocotyloides australis Martin, Cutmore & Cribb, 2018
Podocotyloides brevis Andres & Overstreet, 2013
Podocotyloides brevivesiculatus Martin, Cutmore & Cribb, 2018
Podocotyloides buckleyi (Saoud & Ramadan, 1984)
Podocotyloides ghanensis (Fischthal & Thomas, 1970) Aken'Ova, 2003
Podocotyloides ghardaguensis (Saoud & Ramadan, 1984)
Podocotyloides gracilis (Yamaguti, 1952) Pritchard, 1966
Podocotyloides magnatestis Aleshkina & Gaevskaya, 1985
Podocotyloides parupenei (Manter, 1963) Pritchard, 1966
Podocotyloides petalophallus Yamaguti, 1934
Podocotyloides stenometra Pritchard, 1966

References

Opecoelidae
Plagiorchiida genera